Rod Montoya (born October 25, 1966) is an American politician who has served in the New Mexico House of Representatives from the 1st district since 2015.

References

1966 births
Living people
Republican Party members of the New Mexico House of Representatives
21st-century American politicians
People from Farmington, New Mexico